Shoulder dystocia is when, after vaginal delivery of the head, the baby's anterior shoulder gets caught above the mother's pubic bone. Signs include retraction of the baby's head back into the vagina, known as "turtle sign". Complications for the baby may include brachial plexus injury, or clavicle fracture. Complications for the mother may include vaginal or perineal tears, postpartum bleeding, or uterine rupture.

Risk factors include gestational diabetes, previous history of the condition, operative vaginal delivery, obesity in the mother, an overly large baby, and epidural anesthesia. It is diagnosed when the body fails to deliver within one minute of delivery of the baby's head. It is a type of obstructed labour.

Shoulder dystocia is an obstetric emergency. Initial efforts to release a shoulder typically include: with a woman on her back pushing the legs outward and upward, pushing on the abdomen above the pubic bone, and making a cut in the vagina. If these are not effective, efforts to manually rotate the baby's shoulders or placing the woman on all fours may be tried. Shoulder dystocia occurs in approximately 0.4% to 1.4% of vaginal births. Death as a result of shoulder dystocia is very uncommon.

Signs and symptoms
One characteristic of a minority of shoulder dystocia deliveries is the turtle sign, which involves the appearance and retraction of the baby's head (analogous to a turtle withdrawing into its shell), and a red, puffy face. This occurs when the baby's shoulder is obstructed by the maternal pelvis.

Complications

One complication of shoulder dystocia is damage to the upper brachial plexus nerves. These supply the sensory and motor components of the shoulder, arm, and hands. The ventral roots (motor pathway) are most prone to injury. The cause of injury to the baby is debated, but a probable mechanism is manual stretching of the nerves, which in itself can cause injury. Excess tension may physically tear the nerve roots out from the neonatal spinal column, resulting in total dysfunction.

Possible complications include:
 Neonatal complications:
 Klumpke paralysis
 Erb's palsy
 Hypoxia
 Death
 Cerebral palsy
 Maternal complications:
 Postpartum bleeding (11%)
 Perineal lacerations that extend into the anal sphincter
 Pubic symphysis separation
 Neuropathy of lateral femoral cutaneous nerve
 Uterine rupture

Risk factors
About 16% of deliveries where shoulder dystocia occurs have conventional risk factors. These include diabetes, fetal macrosomia, and maternal obesity.

Risk factors:
 Age >35
 Short in stature
 Small or abnormal pelvis
 More than 42 weeks gestation
 High estimated fetal weight
 Maternal diabetes (2–4 fold increase in risk)

Factors which increase the risk/are warning signs:
 Need for oxytocics
 Prolonged first or second stage of labour
 Turtle sign (head bobbing in the second stage)
 Failure to restitute
 No shoulder rotation or descent
 Instrumental delivery

For women with a previous shoulder dystocia, the risk of recurrence is at least 10%.

Management
The steps to treating a shoulder dystocia are outlined by the mnemonic ALARMER:
 Ask for help.  This involves asking for the help of an obstetrician, anesthesia, and for pediatrics for subsequent resuscitation of the infant that may be needed if the methods below fail;
 L hyperflexion and abduction at the hips (McRoberts maneuver);
 Anterior shoulder disimpaction (suprapubic pressure);
 Rotation of the shoulder (Rubin maneuver);
 M delivery of posterior arm;
 Episiotomy;
 Roll over on all fours.

Typically the procedures are performed in the order listed and the sequence ends whenever a technique is successful. Intentional fracturing of the clavicle, a procedure known as cleidotomy, is another possibility at non-operative vaginal delivery prior to Zavanelli's maneuver or symphysiotomy, both of which are considered extraordinary treatment measures. Pushing on the fundus is not recommended.

Simulation training of health care providers to prevent delays in delivery when a shoulder dystocia presents is useful.

Procedures
A number of labor positions and maneuvers are sequentially performed in attempt to facilitate delivery. These include:
 McRoberts maneuver; involves hyperflexing the mother's legs tightly to her abdomen. This widens the pelvis, and flattens the spine in the lower back (lumbar spine). If this maneuver does not succeed, an assistant applies pressure on the lower abdomen (suprapubic pressure), and the delivered head is also gently pulled. The technique is effective in about 42% of cases;
 Suprapubic pressure (or Rubin I);
 Rubin II or posterior pressure on the anterior shoulder, which would bring the baby into an oblique position with the head somewhat towards the vagina;

 Wood's screw maneuver which leads to turning the anterior shoulder to the posterior and vice versa (somewhat the opposite of  Rubin II maneuver);
 Jacquemier's maneuver (also called Barnum's maneuver), or delivery of the posterior shoulder first, in which the forearm and hand are identified in the birth canal, and gently pulled;
 Gaskin maneuver involves moving the mother to an all fours position with the back arched, widening the pelvic outlet.

More drastic maneuvers include:
 Zavanelli's maneuver, which involves pushing the baby's head back in (internal cephalic replacement) followed by a cesarean section;
 Intentional causing clavicular fractures, which reduces the diameter of the shoulders that requires to pass through the birth canal;
 Maternal symphysiotomy, which makes the opening of the birth canal laxer by breaking the connective tissue between the two pubes bones;
 Abdominal rescue, described by O'Shaughnessy, where a hysterotomy facilitates vaginal delivery of the impacted shoulder.

Epidemiology
Shoulder dystocia occurs in about 0.15% to 4% of term vaginal births.

References

External links 

 GLOWM video showing management of shoulder dystocia

Complications of labour and delivery
Medical mnemonics
Wikipedia medicine articles ready to translate